Beach handball competition at the 2014 Asian Beach Games was held in Phuket, Thailand from 15 to 22 November 2014 at Karon Beach, Phuket.

Medalists

Medal table

Results

Men

Preliminary round

Group A

|-
|15 Nov
|11:00
|align=right|
|align=center|0–2
|align=left|
|14–21||15–19||
|-
|15 Nov
|16:00
|align=right|
|align=center|2–0
|align=left|
|14–11||27–17||
|-
|16 Nov
|11:00
|align=right|
|align=center|2–0
|align=left|
|23–11||26–10||
|-
|16 Nov
|16:00
|align=right|
|align=center|0–2
|align=left|
|16–26||13–18||
|-
|17 Nov
|11:00
|align=right|
|align=center|2–0
|align=left|
|28–15||22–18||
|-
|17 Nov
|16:00
|align=right|
|align=center|0–2
|align=left|
|16–20||14–18||
|-
|18 Nov
|11:00
|align=right|
|align=center|2–0
|align=left|
|19–13||20–7||
|-
|18 Nov
|16:00
|align=right|
|align=center|0–2
|align=left|
|15–24||14–20||
|-
|19 Nov
|11:00
|align=right|
|align=center|2–0
|align=left|
|21–18||21–20||
|-
|19 Nov
|16:00
|align=right|
|align=center|2–0
|align=left|
|16–13||18–14||
|}

Group B

|-
|15 Nov
|10:00
|align=right|
|align=center|0–2
|align=left|
|11–27||9–20||
|-
|15 Nov
|15:00
|align=right|
|align=center|0–2
|align=left|
|10–15||10–15||
|-
|15 Nov
|17:00
|align=right|
|align=center|2–0
|align=left|
|20–6||22–10||
|-
|16 Nov
|10:00
|align=right|
|align=center|2–1
|align=left|
|18–12||10–11||7–4
|-
|16 Nov
|15:00
|align=right|
|align=center|0–2
|align=left|
|9–21||11–15||
|-
|16 Nov
|17:00
|align=right|
|align=center|2–0
|align=left|
|17–14||18–10||
|-
|17 Nov
|10:00
|align=right|
|align=center|2–0
|align=left|
|22–15||22–16||
|-
|17 Nov
|15:00
|align=right|
|align=center|0–2
|align=left|
|5–21||13–22||
|-
|17 Nov
|17:00
|align=right|
|align=center|0–2
|align=left|
|16–17||16–20||
|-
|18 Nov
|10:00
|align=right|
|align=center|2–0
|align=left|
|15–13||20–14||
|-
|18 Nov
|15:00
|align=right|
|align=center|2–0
|align=left|
|22–21||21–20||
|-
|18 Nov
|17:00
|align=right|
|align=center|2–0
|align=left|
|24–14||21–9||
|-
|19 Nov
|10:00
|align=right|
|align=center|0–2
|align=left|
|13–16||12–14||
|-
|19 Nov
|15:00
|align=right|
|align=center|0–2
|align=left|
|20–24||15–16||
|-
|19 Nov
|17:00
|align=right|
|align=center|1–2
|align=left|
|21–18||19–20||6–8
|}

Placement 9th–11th

Semifinals

|-
|20 Nov
|10:00
|align=right|
|align=center|2–0
|align=left|
|13–12||16–8||
|}

Placement 9th–10th

|-
|21 Nov
|15:00
|align=right|
|align=center|2–0
|align=left|
|15–13||15–11||
|}

Placement 5th–8th

Semifinals

|-
|20 Nov
|11:00
|align=right|
|align=center|0–2
|align=left|
|14–19||16–21||
|-
|20 Nov
|15:00
|align=right|
|align=center|1–2
|align=left|
|18–19||15–14||6–8
|}

Placement 7th–8th

|-
|21 Nov
|16:00
|align=right|
|align=center|1–2
|align=left|
|8–18||14–10||4–5
|}

Placement 5th–6th

|-
|21 Nov
|17:00
|align=right|
|align=center|2–0
|align=left|
|19–12||19–16||
|}

Final round

Semifinals

|-
|20 Nov
|16:00
|align=right|
|align=center|2–0
|align=left|
|21–14||16–13||
|-
|20 Nov
|17:30
|align=right|
|align=center|0–2
|align=left|
|14–21||12–20||
|}

Bronze medal match

|-
|22 Nov
|15:00
|align=right|
|align=center|1–2
|align=left|
|13–24||12–11||2–5
|}

Gold medal match

|-
|22 Nov
|17:00
|align=right|
|align=center|2–0
|align=left|
|17–16||16–14||
|}

Women

Preliminary round

Group A

|-
|15 Nov
|11:00
|align=right|
|align=center|0–2
|align=left|
|15–23||18–19||
|-
|15 Nov
|17:00
|align=right|
|align=center|0–2
|align=left|
|8–15||12–15||
|-
|16 Nov
|11:00
|align=right|
|align=center|2–0
|align=left|
|22–11||18–6||
|-
|16 Nov
|17:00
|align=right|
|align=center|0–2
|align=left|
|7–16||8–13||
|-
|17 Nov
|11:00
|align=right|
|align=center|2–0
|align=left|
|17–8||24–3||
|-
|17 Nov
|16:00
|align=right|
|align=center|2–1
|align=left|
|9–10||14–13||6–4
|-
|18 Nov
|11:00
|align=right|
|align=center|2–0
|align=left|
|17–8||16–8||
|-
|18 Nov
|17:00
|align=right|
|align=center|0–2
|align=left|
|8–11||6–24||
|-
|19 Nov
|10:00
|align=right|
|align=center|1–2
|align=left|
|15–10||5–10||9–11
|-
|19 Nov
|16:00
|align=right|
|align=center|2–0
|align=left|
|19–4||16–14||
|}

Group B

|-
|15 Nov
|10:00
|align=right|
|align=center|0–2
|align=left|
|10–15||3–23||
|-
|15 Nov
|16:00
|align=right|
|align=center|1–2
|align=left|
|16–24||20–16||8–10
|-
|16 Nov
|10:00
|align=right|
|align=center|0–2
|align=left|
|8–13||8–10||
|-
|16 Nov
|16:00
|align=right|
|align=center|2–1
|align=left|
|14–12||20–22||7–1
|-
|17 Nov
|10:00
|align=right|
|align=center|2–0
|align=left|
|25–9||18–10||
|-
|17 Nov
|17:00
|align=right|
|align=center|0–2
|align=left|
|8–9||6–9||
|-
|18 Nov
|10:00
|align=right|
|align=center|2–0
|align=left|
|18–4||17–9||
|-
|18 Nov
|16:00
|align=right|
|align=center|0–2
|align=left|
|14–17||11–17||
|-
|19 Nov
|11:00
|align=right|
|align=center|0–2
|align=left|
|12–22||12–24||
|-
|19 Nov
|17:00
|align=right|
|align=center|0–2
|align=left|
|12–15||5–18||
|}

Placement 9th–10th

|-
|20 Nov
|10:00
|align=right|
|align=center|2–0
|align=left|
|18–10||14–9||
|}

Placement 5th–8th

Semifinals

|-
|20 Nov
|11:00
|align=right|
|align=center|1–2
|align=left|
|11–13||15–13||6–9
|-
|20 Nov
|15:00
|align=right|
|align=center|2–0
|align=left|
|18–15||13–12||
|}

Placement 7th–8th

|-
|21 Nov
|16:00
|align=right|
|align=center|2–1
|align=left|
|13–6||7–11||10–9
|}

Placement 5th–6th

|-
|21 Nov
|17:00
|align=right|
|align=center|2–1
|align=left|
|14–20||9–8||7–4
|}

Final round

Semifinals

|-
|20 Nov
|16:00
|align=right|
|align=center|2–1
|align=left|
|15–22||21–20||9–6
|-
|20 Nov
|16:45
|align=right|
|align=center|2–0
|align=left|
|18–10||16–14||
|}

Bronze medal match

|-
|22 Nov
|15:00
|align=right|
|align=center|1–2
|align=left|
|15–12||13–15||10–12
|}

Gold medal match

|-
|22 Nov
|16:00
|align=right|
|align=center|0–2
|align=left|
|12–17||12–13||
|}

References

External links 
 
Tournament summary for men
Tournament summary for women

2014 Asian Beach Games events
2014 in handball
2014